The 1992 LPGA Championship was the 38th LPGA Championship, played May 14–17 at Bethesda Country Club in Bethesda, Maryland, a suburb northwest of Washington, D.C.

Betsy King won the fifth of her six major titles, eleven strokes ahead of runners-up JoAnne Carner, Liselotte Neumann, and Karen Noble. She led by five strokes after 54 holes, and her victory margin was the largest to date, passing Patty Sheehan's ten-stroke win in 1984, and it stood until 2010. King was the first to card all four rounds in the sixties in an LPGA major; it was her only win at the LPGA Championship.

This was the third of four consecutive LPGA Championships at Bethesda Country Club.

Past champions in the field

Source:

Final leaderboard
Sunday, May 17, 1992

Source:

References

External links
Bethesda Country Club

Women's PGA Championship
Golf in Maryland
LPGA Championship
LPGA Championship
LPGA Championship
LPGA Championship
Women's sports in Maryland